Dǎnuţ Dragomir Şomcherechi (born 10 April 1973) is a Romanian former football player and currently a manager. He made his Liga I debut on 11 March 2000 for Argeş Piteşti, in a 0–1 defeat against Rapid București. Şomcherechi played most of his career for Baia Mare (144 matches) and for Argeş Piteşti (128 matches), but also played for teams such as: Oțelul Galați, Universitatea Cluj or Progresul București. He retired in 2011 at 38 years old.

External links
 
 

1973 births
Living people
People from Baia Sprie
Romanian footballers
Association football defenders
Liga I players
FC Argeș Pitești players
ASC Oțelul Galați players
Liga II players
CS Minaur Baia Mare (football) players
FC Universitatea Cluj players
FC Progresul București players
Romanian football managers
CS Național Sebiș managers